The 32 megawatt AC Long Island Solar Farm (LISF), located in Upton, New York, was the largest photovoltaic array in the eastern U.S. in November 2011. The LISF is made up of 164,312 solar panels from BP Solar which provide enough electricity for roughly 4,500 households. The project will cause the abatement of more than 30,000 metric tons of carbon dioxide emissions per year. LISF is co-owned by BP Solar and MetLife through Long Island Solar Farm LLC. Municipal utility Long Island Power Authority (LIPA) buys the  power plant's output, which is estimated at 44 GWh annually, under a 20-year power purchase agreement (PPA). Payments over that time are expected to total $298 million (34¢/kWh, 60¢/LIPA customer/month). The project was engineered by Blue Oak Energy and construction subcontracted to Hawkeye LLC from Hauppauge, New York. The plant earned the Best Photovoltaic Project of Year Award from the New York Solar Energy Industries Association.

The solar farm uses 25 of the 1.25 MVA inverters and a  collector system. Since the connection to the grid is at 69 kV, and acquiring a spare step-up transformer of that capacity has a long lead time, a spare transformer is maintained onsite. Each inverter has an associated meteorological station to help researchers correlate plant output with observed and predicted weather, to help learn how to integrate photovoltaics into the power grid.

A formal case study of the development of the Long Island Solar Farm was published by the U.S. Department of Energy in May 2013.



Eastern Long Island Solar Project
The 17 MW (AC) Eastern Long Island Solar Project or Suffolk Solar Carport Project consists of a group of projects, three at LIRR carparks. $124 million has been allocated to pay for the electricity generated, over 20 years, from the project (approximately 27¢/kWh). Plans to install solar panels at Ronkonkoma LIRR have stalled.

Clean Solar Initiative
LIPA has a Clean Solar Initiative which will install an additional 50 MW of solar photovoltaics, to be paid $0.22/kWh over a 20-year period. 5 MW is reserved for small systems of from 50 kW to 150 kW, 10 MW for systems from 150 kW to 500 kW, and the remaining 35 MW is for systems of any size, up to 20 MW. All systems must be connected to the grid at the 13.2 kV level. Systems connected before July 2012 are not eligible.

References

External links

Aerial view
Photos

Energy infrastructure completed in 2011
Buildings and structures in Suffolk County, New York
Power stations in New York (state)
Photovoltaic power stations in the United States
MetLife
BP
2011 establishments in New York (state)
Brookhaven, New York